Moon Over Hellesta or Clouds Over Hellesta (Swedish: Moln över Hellesta) is a 1956 Swedish thriller film directed by Rolf Husberg and starring Anita Björk, Birger Malmsten and Doris Svedlund. It is an adaptation of the 1954 novel Clouds Over Hellesta by Margit Söderholm.

It was shot at the Centrumateljéerna Studios in Stockholm. The film's sets were designed by the art director Nils Nilsson. Location shooting took place at the Danbyholm manor house near Katrineholm.

Synopsis
A newly-engaged young woman travels to her future husband's country estate Hallesta, but becomes concerned about the manner in which his previous wife died.

Main cast
 Anita Björk as Margareta Snellman 
 Birger Malmsten as Carl Anckarberg 
 Doris Svedlund as Eva Anckarberg 
 Isa Quensel as Emmy Anckarberg 
 Olof Sandborg as Gustafsson 
 Brita Öberg as Annie Gustafsson 
 Dora Söderberg as Agnes 
 Sif Ruud as Ulla Forsberg 
 Liane Linden as Louise Holmqvist 
 Birgitta Andersson as Sonja Elbegaard 
 Bengt Eklund as Valter Holmqvist 
 Erik 'Bullen' Berglund as Maj. Claes Bång

References

Bibliography
 Alfred Krawc. International Directory of Cinematographers, Set- and Costume Designers in Film: Denmark, Finland, Norway, Sweden (from the beginnings to 1984). Saur, 1986.
 Per Olov Qvist & Peter von Bagh. Guide to the Cinema of Sweden and Finland. Greenwood Publishing Group, 2000.

External links 
 

1956 films
1950s thriller films
Swedish thriller films
1950s Swedish-language films
Films directed by Rolf Husberg
Films based on Swedish novels
1950s Swedish films
Swedish black-and-white films